O'Connor House may refer to:

James O'Connor Three-Decker, Worcester, Massachusetts, listed on the National Register of Historic Places (NRHP)
James O'Connor-John Trybowski Three-Decker, Worcester, Massachusetts, NRHP-listed
Cornelius O'Connor House, Homer, Nebraska, NRHP-listed
O'Connor House (St. Thomas, North Dakota), NRHP-listed
Barden-O'Connor House, Victoria, Texas, NRHP-listed
Thomas M. O'Connor House, Victoria, Texas, NRHP-listed

See also
O'Connor Building (disambiguation)